Klassical Dream (foaled 30 March 2014) is a French thoroughbred racehorse competing in National Hunt racing.

Career
Bred in France, Klassical Dream started his career hurdling for owners Ecurie Zingaro.  Following seven runs, primarily at Auteuil, Klassical Dream had picked up just one victory inn the Prix de Gastines at Sablé-sur-Sarthe.

He was sold in 2018 and training switched to Willie Mullins in Ireland.  His first race for new owner Mrs Joanne Coleman came at Leopardstown and ended with victory.  Klassical Dream would go on to win three Grade 1 races in a row in 2019 the Chanelle Pharma Novice Hurdle, the Supreme Novices Hurdle at Cheltenham and the Champion Novice Hurdle at Punchestown a month later.

Two defeats would follow in Ireland, including a third place in the Morgiana Hurdle. Klassical Dream went on to win two Grade 1 races in 2021, the Champion Stayers Hurdle at Punchestown  and later the Christmas Hurdle at Leopardstown.

References

Cheltenham Festival winners
2014 racehorse births
Racehorses trained in Ireland
Racehorses bred in France